West End Common is a   Local Nature Reserve on the north-western outskirts of Esher in Surrey. It is owned and managed by  Elmbridge Borough Council. It is part of Esher Commons, which is a Site of Special Scientific Interest.

The common has wet areas, which have the rare  flowering marsh plant starfruit, woodland with ancient oak and beech trees, and grassland. More than 2,000 species of insects have been recorded.

There is access from West End Lane.

References

Local Nature Reserves in Surrey